Presidential elections were held in Ecuador in 1865. The result was a victory for Jerónimo Carrión, who received ~73% of the vote. He took office on 7 September.

Results

References

Presidential elections in Ecuador
Ecuador
1865 in Ecuador
Election and referendum articles with incomplete results